Bishops Corner is located in West Hartford, Connecticut, United States, at the crossroads of Albany Avenue (U.S. Route 44) and North Main Street.

Libraries and the arts

Bishops Corner is home to one of West Hartford's three main libraries, the others being the Noah Webster Library and Faxon. The establishment, which is over forty years old, has recently completed a "Senior Center,"  where elderly citizens may take part in educational and leisure activities such as computer training.

There has been a resurgence of arts in Bishops Corner. Residents can attend "Poetry on the Patio" during the summer.

References 

Buildings and structures in West Hartford, Connecticut
Geography of Hartford County, Connecticut
Bishops Corner was always a busy intersection because of the roads running through it,” Sheila Dailey of the Noah Webster House & West Hartford Historical Society writes. “The real development began in 1953 with the opening of the Lord & Taylor department store. This store anchored the first of the four strip plazas on each corner of the intersection.”